Kadıköy, known in classical antiquity and during the Roman and Byzantine eras as Chalcedon, is a large, populous, and cosmopolitan district in the Asian side of Istanbul, Turkey, on the northern shore of the Sea of Marmara. It partially faces the historic city centre of Fatih on the European side of the Bosporus. One of the expensive neighborhood in Istanbul. Kadıköy is also the name of the most prominent neighbourhood of the district, a residential and commercial area that, with its numerous bars, cinemas and bookshops, is the liberal cultural centre of the Anatolian side of Istanbul. Kadıköy became a district in 1928 when it was separated from Üsküdar district. The neighbourhoods of İçerenköy, Bostancı and Suadiye were also separated from the district of Kartal in the same year, and eventually joined the newly formed district of Kadıköy. Its neighbouring districts are Üsküdar to the northwest, Ataşehir to the northeast, Maltepe to the southeast, and Kartal beyond Maltepe.

History 

Kadıköy is an older settlement than most of those on the Anatolian side of the city of İstanbul. Relics dating to 5500-3500 BC (Chalcolithic period) have been found at the Fikirtepe Mound, and articles of stone, bone, ceramic, jewelry and bronze show that there has been a continuous settlement since prehistoric times. A port settlement dating from the Phoenicians has also been discovered. Chalcedon was the first settlement that the Greeks from Megara established on the Bosphorus, in 685 BC, a few years before they established Byzantium on the other side of the strait in 667 BC. Chalcedon became known as the 'city of the blind', the story being that Byzantium was founded following a prophecy that a great capital would be built 'opposite the city of the blind' (meaning that the people of Chalcedon must have been blind not to see the obvious value of the peninsula on the Golden Horn as a natural defensive harbour). The fourth ecumenical church council, Council of Chalcedon, was held there in 451 AD.

Chalcedon changed hands time and time again, as Persians, Bithynians, Romans, Byzantines, Arabs, Crusaders, and Turks passed through the area, which was badly damaged during the Fourth Crusade and came into Ottoman hands in 1353, a full century before Constantinople. Thus, Kadıköy has the oldest mosque in İstanbul, built almost a century before the conquest of Constantinople in 1453.

At the time of the conquest, Chalcedon was a rural settlement outside the protection of the city. It was soon put under the jurisdiction of the Constantinople courts, hence the name Kadıköy, which means Village of the Judge. In the Ottoman period, Kadıköy became a market for agricultural goods and in time developed into a residential area for people who would commute to the city by boat.

According to Ottoman estimations of 1882, the district of Kadıköy had a total population of 6,733, consisting of 2,695 Muslims, 1,831 Armenians, 1,822 Greeks, 249 Jews, 92 Latins, 28 Bulgarians and 16 Catholics.

Kadıköy today

Transport 
The major Haydarpaşa Terminal of the Turkish State Railways is located close to Kadıköy's centre and was opened in 1908 as the terminus of the İstanbul-Baghdad and İstanbul-Damascus-Medina railways. The terminal closed due to infrastructure works in 2013 and reopened in 2018, serving east- and south-bound international, domestic and regional trains.

The Söğütlüçeşme railway station, the next station after Haydarpaşa Terminal, is the terminus of the Metrobus line to European side of İstanbul.

The M4 line of the Istanbul Metro runs from Kadıköy to Tavşantepe daily between 6:00 and 23:57.

The centre of Kadıköy today is the transportation hub for people commuting between the Asian side of the city and the European side across the Bosphorus. There is a large bus and minibus terminal next to the ferry quay. Ferries are the most dominantly visible form of transport in Kadıköy, and the central market area is adjacent to the ferry quay.

Public transportation with terminus in Kadıköy:

Bus system
 For more lines, visit: http://www.iett.istanbul/en/main/hatlar

Metro

M4 Kadıköy-Sabiha Gökçen (Sabiha Gökçen International Airport)

Nostalgic tram
T3 (Ring) Mühürdar-Bahariye-Moda (in centrum)

Ferryboats

Traditional ferries,
Eminönü
Karaköy
Kabataş
Beşiktaş
Princes' Islands

Sea buses,
Bostancı-Kadıköy-Yenikapı-Bakırköy
Kabataş

Politics 
The centre-left Republican People's Party (CHP) is usually successful in Kadıköy in both local and national elections. Since the mid-1990s the mayor has been from the CHP. Former mayor S. Öztürk is often credited with the recent growth in the number of shopping and leisure areas around Kadıköy, especially since the pedestrianisation of Bahariye Street, which many say has become the Kadıköy equivalent of İstiklal Avenue, including its nostalgic trams, on the European side of Istanbul.

Education 

Marmara University has most of its buildings in Kadıköy, including the large and elegant Haydarpaşa Campus, while the largest private university in İstanbul, Yeditepe University, is located on the hill named "Kayışdağı" at the easternmost edge of the borough (Which later connected to Ataşehir). A new state university, İstanbul Medeniyet University, opened in 2010. It has its main building in Göztepe, Merdivenköy, and has begun to develop campuses in both Kadıköy and Üsküdar. The campuses are divided by the D-100 Highway. Each have a metro station close by.

Another private institution for higher education, the Doğuş University, is situated in the Acıbadem neighborhood of Kadıköy.

There are also remarkable high schools such as Atatürk Fen Lisesi, Kadıköy Anadolu Lisesi, Göztepe İhsan Kurşunoğlu Anadolu Lisesi, Mustafa Saffet Anadolu Lisesi, İstanbul Anadolu Lisesi, İstanbul Kadıköy Lisesi, FMV Özel Erenköy Işık Lisesi, and Saint-Joseph French High School.

Shopping 

Kadıköy is a busy shopping district, with a wide variety of atmospheres and architectural styles. The streets are varied, some being narrow alleyways and others, such as Bahariye Caddesi, being pedestrian zones. Turkey's biggest food market is there, starting next to the Osman Ağa Mosque, and has an immense turnover of fresh foods and other products from all around Turkey, including a wide range of fresh fish and seafood, olive oil soap, and so on. There are also modern shopping centres, most notably the large Tepe Nautilus Shopping Mall behind the center of Kadıköy, and pavements crowded with street vendors selling socks, unlicensed copies of popular novels, and other products. In the streets behind the main post office, there is a large number of well-known bookshops selling both new and second-hand books, craft-shops and picture-framers, and a number of shops selling music CDs and related ephemera such as film posters and T-shirts. Hard Rock and Heavy Metal music is sold in the arcade named Akmar Pasajı, where associated items are also sold. On Sundays this area becomes a large second-hand book and music street market. Being a crowded shopping district, Kadıköy has many buskers, shoe shine boys, glue sniffers and schoolchildren in the streets selling flowers, chewing gum and packets of tissues.

At the top of the shopping district there is an intersection, with a statue of a bull, called Altıyol (Six Ways), where a road leads to the civic buildings and a huge street market called Salı Pazarı (Tuesday Market). The working-class residential districts of Hasanpaşa and Fikirtepe are located behind the civic buildings.

Housing 
There is a lot of residential property in the centre of Kadıköy, mostly somewhat dilapidated today, but there are still quiet suburban streets. The area is home to many students as well as a small number of foreign residents.

Attractions, entertainment and eating 

Kadıköy has many narrow streets filled with cafés, bars and restaurants, as well as many cinemas. Süreyya Opera House is a recent redevelopment of the same named historic movie theatre.

The market area is mostly closed to traffic and contains a wide variety of fast food restaurants serving toasted sandwiches, hamburgers and döner. There are also traditional Turkish restaurants and patisseries, bridge schools, wine houses, bars with jazz, folk and rock music, as well as working class tea and backgammon houses.

Behind the coast, lies a large shopping and residential district winding uphill to the Bahariye Caddesi pedestrian zone. This area was transformed during the economic boom of the 1990s and shops were opened and bars at surrounding.

Kadıköy's entertainment is generally not of the affluent type. It has a more working class ambiance; therefore, it is easier to find food of the like of kebab and fried mussels than haute cuisine, although one of İstanbul's most traditional Turkish cuisine representatives, Yanyalı Fehmi Lokantası and the foreign tourist attracting Çiya is found here. Also, the oldest recorded maker of Turkish delight, Hacı Bekir and chocolate maker Baylan are located in Kadıköy.

Kadıköy does not have as much nightlife as Beyoğlu (where nightlife also continues much later into the night), nor does it have Nişantaşı's style of shopping or the Bosphorus for nightlife. Instead, it is often considered a modest alternative but may still be regarded as vibrant and cosy. Residents like to frequent the seaside to walk or sit in the grass with a view of the European side of Istanbul across the Bosporus.

İstanbul Toy Museum in Göztepe has on display 4,000 toys and miniatures, from Turkey and abroad; many of the exhibits are antiques, some of which date back nearly 200 years.  The first floor of the museum is actually the site of the Eyüp Toy Shop, a toy shop that had closed down in the 1950s.

Surrounding residential areas

Coastal areas 
Along the coast, away from the centre of Kadıköy, there are many expensive shops and the area becomes more upmarket in neighbourhoods such as Moda and Fenerbahçe, which are attractive, long-established residential areas. These both lie within the bounds of the borough of Kadıköy, and have many restaurants, cafés and bars by the sea. There is a path here along the sea-front from Kadıköy; the tram to Moda calls here.

Moda is an old, quiet, cosmopolitan İstanbul neighbourhood, but is beginning to experience economic and aesthetic problems, with there being a lack of car parking and some run-down shops and other buildings. As elsewhere in İstanbul, many historic houses have been demolished and replaced with apartment buildings; however, Moda is generally considered one of the more pleasant residential districts in the city. There are numerous churches in Moda with active congregations, and well-known schools, such as the Lycée Saint-Joseph and Kadıköy Anadolu Lisesi. There is a small, attractive theatre in Moda named Oyun Atölyesi, founded by actor Haluk Bilginer. The area is also well known for its multiple modern cafes, bars, shops and is popular among Istanbul's creative class and tourists.

Another smart new district is Acıbadem. This area has one of the best-known private hospitals in the city and a long avenue of smart cafés, restaurants and ice cream parlours.

Beyond this area, the huge stadium of Fenerbahçe Football Club dominates the skyline. From here, the long shopping street named Bağdat Caddesi (Baghdad Avenue) heads east and there are many affluent neighbourhoods between the avenue and the coast. Until the 1950s these areas, such as Kalamış, Göztepe, Caddebostan, Bağdad Avenue, Erenköy, and Suadiye, were full of summer houses and mansions for the city's wealthy upper middle class. Since the Bosphorus Bridge was built, it has become easier to commute from here to the European side of İstanbul, and most of these summer houses have been demolished and replaced with modern apartment buildings. The coast here has a long stretch of seaside parks and yacht marinas, and the streets behind the coast in areas such as Caddebostan are lined with numerous bars and cafés.

From Bostancı onwards the economic level progressively lessens, so there are more retired and working-class residents here. There are no more villas, excepting some on the coast at Dragos, and the apartment buildings are narrower and less widely spaced. Bostancı itself is a busy shopping district built around a railway station.

Inland areas 

Inland from the coast there is a great deal of housing development: some of this has little infrastructure, while most is more expensive, especially in areas such as Kozyatağı and İçerenköy. These districts house many of İstanbul's upper-middle class residents. These neighbourhoods are mainly built around wide avenues and tree-lined streets, with four to six-storey apartment buildings that have sizable gardens and car-parking around them. Especially in Kozyatağı, there are old Ottoman houses nearly in every houses' garden (Each house or apartment has a big garden with parking lots and arbours while these gardens used to be the old house's). Kozyatağı, Suadiye and Kazasker used to be one of the most popular summer areas for wealthy İstanbul residents. Today, Kozyatağı has tree-lined streets, especially magnolia, linden and fruit trees such as medlar trees, plum trees, cherry, mulberry and quince trees, many large greenfields, parks, children parks. These areas, Suadiye, Bağdat Caddesi, Kalamış, Kozyatağı, Fenerbahçe have today, upper-middle or upper class residents. There are many schools, hospitals, shops and restaurants in these areas. There is also a large Carrefour and Bauhaus store on the E5 highway in this part of Kadıköy.

In the late 1990s, new luxury housing developments such as Ataşehir began to be constructed in the previously undeveloped area north of the E5 highway. These have their own shops, private colleges, sports centres and other facilities. Ataşehir separated from Kadıköy in 2009 elections.

Climate 
Kadıköy experiences a Mediterranean climate (Csa/Cs) according to both Köppen and Trewartha climate classifications, with cool winters and warm to hot summers. Its milder winters allow it to be classified in USDA hardiness zone 9b, while its summers are hot enough to be classified as AHS heat zone 4.

Architecture 

Kadıköy has many houses from the Ottoman and some from Roman period which are hidden in its side streets. Some of them have been turned into cafés, pubs and restaurants, particularly serving seafood and rest of them waiting for restoration.

Yeldeğirmeni is an important neighbourhood in terms of architecture.

Sport 
The district is home to the major Turkish multi-sport club Fenerbahçe SK and their football stadium, the Şükrü Saracoğlu Stadium. Following important victories, all neighbourhoods of Kadıköy are crowded with celebrating people. The stadium hosted the 2009 UEFA Cup Final. The area also has a rugby union team, Kadıköy Rugby, which was the first official rugby club in Turkey.

The multi-purpose arena of Caferağa Sport Hall, located in the center of Kadıköy's shopping district, is home to the basketball teams of Alpella (men team) and Fenerbahçe İstanbul (women team), volleyball teams (Fenerbahçe Men's Volleyball and Fenerbahçe Women's Volleyball).

The district was also home to KadıköySpor, a basketball club that evolved into the current top-level club Anadolu Efes.

Religion
Kadıköy has been always a place with population belonging to the three main religions, Islam, Christianity and Judaism. There are still many examples of mosques, Greek or Armenian churches and synagogues, as with the rest of İstanbul. The city is the see of the Metropolis of Chalcedon, one of the four remaining metropolises of the Ecumenical Patriarchate of Constantinople in Turkey today.

Hemdat Israel Synagogue, situated in Yeldeğirmeni neighbourhood close to Haydarpaşa Terminal, is one of the oldest Jewish houses of prayer in İstanbul.

International relations

Twin towns – sister cities
Kadıköy is twinned with:
 Agios Ioannis Rentis, Greece (since 2003)
 Berlin-Kreuzberg, Germany
 Petah Tikva, Israel

See also 
 Fenerbahçe S.K.
 Hasanpaşa Gasworks, 1892 built gasworks, today a amuseum
 History of İstanbul

References

External links 

 Kadıköy Gallery at Fotopedia
 Kadıköy Municipality (English)
 Satellite View of Kadıköy

 
Populated places in Istanbul Province
Fishing communities in Turkey
Jewish communities in Turkey
Districts of Istanbul Province
Transit centers in Istanbul